Edmund Sture (1509/10 – 22 February 1560), of Bradley in North Huish, Devon and the Middle Temple, London, was an English politician.

He was a Member (MP) of the Parliament of England for Plympton Erle in 1545, for Totnes in 1547, for Dartmouth in April 1554 and Exeter in 1555.

References

1510 births
1560 deaths
Members of the Parliament of England for Plympton Erle
Members of the Parliament of England (pre-1707) for Totnes
Members of the Parliament of England for Dartmouth
Members of the Parliament of England (pre-1707) for Exeter
Members of the Middle Temple
Politicians from London
English MPs 1545–1547
English MPs 1547–1552
English MPs 1554
English MPs 1555